Kharvana District is in Varzaqan County, East Azerbaijan province, Iran. At the 2006 National Census, its population was 12,878 in 3,147 households. The following census in 2011 counted 11,495 people in 3,111 households. At the latest census in 2016, the district had 16,753 inhabitants in 5,308 households.

References 

Varzaqan County

Districts of East Azerbaijan Province

Populated places in East Azerbaijan Province

Populated places in Varzaqan County